Grammoechus is a genus of longhorn beetles of the subfamily Lamiinae, containing the following species:

subgenus Grammoechus
 Grammoechus atomarius (Pascoe, 1866)
 Grammoechus bipartitus Ritsema, 1890
 Grammoechus calamophilus Hüdepohl, 1999
 Grammoechus cribripennis (Breuning, 1936)
 Grammoechus javanicus Breuning, 1938
 Grammoechus leucosticticus (Breuning, 1938)
 Grammoechus ochreovariegatus Breuning, 1957
 Grammoechus polygrammus J. Thomson, 1864
 Grammoechus seriatus Holzschuh, 2003
 Grammoechus strenuus (Thomson, 1864)
 Grammoechus tagax Holzschuh, 2003

subgenus Paratossa
 Grammoechus albosparsus Breuning, 1947
 Grammoechus assamensis (Breuning, 1935)
 Grammoechus ligatus Pascoe, 1888
 Grammoechus spilotus (Gahan, 1906)
 Grammoechus triangulifer (Ritsema, 1908)

References

Pteropliini